USS Michael Murphy (DDG-112) is the 62nd ship of the  of guided missile destroyers in the United States Navy. She is named for Medal of Honor recipient Lieutenant Michael P. Murphy (1976–2005). Murphy was posthumously awarded the Medal of Honor for his actions during Operation Red Wings in Afghanistan in June 2005. He was the first sailor awarded the Medal of Honor since the Vietnam War. The ship's name was announced by Secretary of the Navy, Donald C. Winter on 7 May 2008. The ship was christened on 7 May 2011, Murphy's birthday, by her sponsor Maureen Murphy, Michael Murphy's mother. The ship is part of Destroyer Squadron 31 of Naval Surface Group Middle Pacific.

Michael Murphy was intended to be the last ship of the Arleigh Burke-class destroyers but, following the cancellation of the  program after the completion of the first three vessels, the Navy continued construction on the Arleigh Burke class.

Construction and commissioning

Her contract was awarded on 13 September 2002 to the Bath Iron Works and the first cut of steel was made by Vice Admiral John Morgan, the first commanding officer of lead ship of the class, . 
The ship's keel was laid down on 18 June 2010, and during the event, Maureen Murphy and Edwin Bard inscribed the signatures of Murphy's family on an iron plate during a dedication cerrmony for Michael Murphy. The plate was affixed to the ship's hull during construction. After her christening, the destroyer was moved to dry dock for several months in order to finalize construction. On 1 October 2012 the destroyer arrived in New York for her commissioning, which occurred on 6 October.

Service history

2012
On 16 October 2012 Michael Murphy arrived in Barbados for her first international port of call. Led by Ambassador Larry L. Palmer, dozens of sailors ventured out into the community to help the children of Barbados at the Boscobelle Primary School and the Queen Elizabeth Hospital. The sailors presented stuffed animals to the children at the hospital. At the primary school, the crew members helped to beautify the school grounds by planting trees, as well as clearing away brush and debris. The students of the primary school also had stuffed animals donated to them by the sailors. On 21 November, Michael Murphy arrived at her home port of Naval Station Pearl Harbor, part of Joint Base Pearl Harbor–Hickam.

2013
On 15 February 2013 Michael Murphy held her first family day cruise. On 23 May 2013 Michael Murphy held her first change of command ceremony at Joint Base Pearl Harbor–Hickam.

2014
On 4 February 2014 Michael Murphy participated with aviation forces from the Army, Navy, Air Force and Marine Corps in joint training exercise Koa Kai. Participating units conducted integrated flight operations, anti-surface and anti-submarine training. Michael Murphy, already underway, was immediately dispatched to assist in towing and recovery efforts. Michael Murphy received 17 family members of the crew and two civilian contractors from Protecteur; however, due to adverse weather conditions, Michael Murphys attempts to take her under tow were unsuccessful.

On 7 July 2014 Michael Murphy departed Joint Base Pearl Harbor–Hickam to participate in the at-sea phase of the multinational exercise Rim of the Pacific (RIMPAC). On 26 June, RIMPAC 2014 commenced and Michael Murphy participated in all 36 days, including the closing reception on 1 August. On 20 October 2014, Michael Murphy departed on her first deployment to the Western Pacific with the United States Seventh Fleet.

2015
On 26 May 2015, Michael Murphy was awarded with a Canadian Forces Unit Commendation in recognition of the service she provided to the stranded Canadian naval vessel  after she had caught fire at sea.

2017
 
In January 2017, Michael Murphy, along with sister Arleigh Burke-class destroyer  and Ticonderoga-class cruiser , accompanied   in a deployment to the western Pacific. In April of that year, the Carl Vinson Carrier Strike Group (CSG) cancelled a scheduled port call in Australia in response to increasing tensions between North Korea (DPRK) and the United States over the DPRK's nuclear weapons program.

2018
Michael Murphy participated in KAKADU 2018, a multinational exercise hosted by the Royal Australian Navy. During the sea phase of the exercise, forces from twenty-seven countries will train together in several complex warfighting scenarios, including an air defense exercise, gunnery exercise, search and rescue training, underway replenishment approaches, anti-submarine warfare vulnerability training, and divisional tactics.

2019
Michael Murphy deployed to the U.S. Fourth Fleet area of operations, following her participation in exercises UNITAS LX and Teamwork South 2019 in Valparaiso, Chile, from 24 June to 3 July.

Awards
 Battle "E" – (2021)
Canadian Forces Unit Commendation - (2014)
 Retention Excellence Award - (2019)

Gallery

References

External links

 Official page 

Arleigh Burke-class destroyers
Ships built in Bath, Maine
2011 ships